Saskatoon is the largest city in the Canadian province of Saskatchewan. It straddles a bend in the South Saskatchewan River in the central region of the province. It is located along the Trans-Canada Yellowhead Highway, and has served as the cultural and economic hub of central Saskatchewan since its founding in 1882 as a Temperance colony.

With a 2021 census population of 266,141, Saskatoon is the largest city in the province, and the 17th largest Census Metropolitan Area in Canada, with a 2021 census population of 317,480.

Saskatoon is home to the University of Saskatchewan, the Meewasin Valley Authority (which protects the South Saskatchewan River and provides for the city's popular riverbank park spaces), and Wanuskewin Heritage Park (a National Historic Site of Canada and UNESCO World Heritage applicant representing 6,000 years of First Nations history). The Rural Municipality of Corman Park No. 344, the most populous rural municipality in Saskatchewan, surrounds the city and contains many of the developments associated with it, including Wanuskewin.
Saskatoon is named after the saskatoon berry which is native to the region, and is itself derived from the Cree . The city has a significant Indigenous population and several urban Reserves. The city has nine river crossings and is nicknamed "Paris of the Prairies" and "Bridge City".

Historic neighbourhoods of Saskatoon include Nutana and Riversdale, which were separate towns before amalgamating with the town of Saskatoon and incorporating as a city in 1906. Nutana, Riversdale, their historic main streets of Broadway Avenue and 20th Street, as well as the downtown core and other central neighbourhoods are seeing significant reinvestment and redevelopment. Sutherland, the rail town annexed by the city in 1956 that lies beyond the University lands, is now another historic old city.

Etymology

City of Saskatoon archivist Jeff O'Brien wrote that the traditional story of the name is that it was due to the presence of Saskatoon berries in the area. "There is even an almost certainly apocryphal story to the effect that John Lake, upon being given a handful of these berries and told their name immediately cried "Arise, Saskatoon – Queen of the North!"

However, he wrote, "the truth appears to be somewhat less dramatic. The area was long-known to the local Cree as a good place to stock up on willow wands for arrow shafts. Thus the name of the place was "Sask-kwa-tan" – roughly, "the place where willows are cut."

History

In 1882, the Toronto-based Temperance Colonization Society was granted 21 sections of land straddling the South Saskatchewan River, between what is now Warman and Dundurn. The aim of the group was to escape the liquor trade in that city and set up a "dry" community in the Prairie region. The following year settlers, led by John Neilson Lake, arrived on the site of what is now Saskatoon and established the first permanent settlement. The settlers travelled by railway from Ontario to Moose Jaw and then completed the final leg via horse-drawn cart, as the railway had yet to be completed to Saskatoon.

In 1885 the North-West Rebellion affected the tiny community in a variety of ways. Chief Whitecap and Charles Trottier passed through the present day University campus on their way to join Louis Riel's armed forces at Batoche, Saskatchewan. Following the fighting at the Battle of Fish Creek, and the Battle of Batoche, wounded Canadian soldiers convalesced at the Marr Residence which is today a historic site. A few died in care and were buried in the Pioneer Cemetery near the Exhibition Grounds.

A town charter for the west side of the river was obtained in 1903, and this settlement adopted the name Saskatoon; the original townsite. which became a village that year, was renamed Nutana. In 1906 Saskatoon became a city with a population of 4,500, which included the communities of Saskatoon, Riversdale and Nutana. In 1955, a newly established community west of the city, Montgomery Place, was annexed, followed by the neighbouring town of Sutherland in 1956.

Geography

Saskatoon lies on a long belt of rich, potassic chernozem in middle-southern Saskatchewan and is found in the aspen parkland biome. The lack of surrounding mountainous topography gives the city a relatively flat grid, though the city does sprawl over a few hills and into a few valleys. The lowest point in the city is the river, while the highest point is disputed between the suburb of Sutherland in the east side and the Silverwood-River Heights areas in the city's north end. Saskatoon, on a cross-section from west to east, has a general decline in elevation above sea level heading towards the river, and on the east bank of the river, the terrain is mostly level until outside the city, where it begins to decrease in elevation again.

Saskatoon is divided into east and west sides by the South Saskatchewan River. It is then divided into Suburban Development Areas (SDA) which are composed of neighbourhoods. Street addresses are demarcated into north and south (for avenues aligned in those directions) and similar east and west (for streets aligned in those directions). West of the river, the demarcation line for north and south addresses is 22nd Street, while east and west are divided by Idylwyld Drive (north of 20th Street) and Avenue A (south of 20th). On the east side, in order to line up with 22nd/Idylwyld, Lorne Avenue demarcates east and west while Aird Street, a minor residential road, marks the north–south boundary, except in the Sutherland community where a separate east/west demarcation takes place with Central Avenue as the boundary (there is, however, no separate north–south divide). As a result of the unusual demarcation on the east side, few streets there actually carry a "North" or "West" designation, and only a few streets in Sutherland are demarcated "East" and "West".

A second major water feature aside from the river is the Hudson Bay Slough, a remnant of a glacier-formed body of water that at one time dominated the northern end of the city. Industrial development has resulted in most of the slough being drained, however a large remnant has been preserved off Avenue C as part of RCAF Memorial Park, and another portion remains intact within the Hudson Bay Industrial area. Several residential communities also feature "man-made lakes," with Lakeview (developed from the early 1980s) being the first.

Both Blackstrap and Batoche are popular destinations for school field trips.

Climate
Saskatoon experiences a cold semi-arid climate (Köppen: BSk) near the humid continental climate  (Dfb), with typically warm summers and long, cold winters. Climate data from University of Saskatchewan, in the inner city meets semi-arid criteria. This is due to slightly higher average annual temperature and slightly lower average annual precipitation than the Airport, on the city's northwest periphery.

The city has four distinct seasons and is in plant hardiness zone 3b. Saskatoon has a dry climate and sees  of precipitation per year on average, with the summer being the wettest season. Saskatoon is sunnier than average in Canada as a result, averaging 2,268 hours of bright sunshine annually. The extreme temperatures are typically accompanied by below average levels of humidity. Thunderstorms are common in the summer months and can be severe with torrential rain, hail, high winds, intense lightning and, on occasion, tornadoes. The frost-free growing season lasts from 21 May to 15 September, but due to Saskatoon's northerly location, damaging frosts have occurred as late as June 14 and again as early as August.

The "Blizzard of 2007" was described by many residents as the worst they had seen and paralyzed the city with its low visibility, extreme cold and large volume of snow. Many area residents took refuge overnight at area work places, shopping centres, hospitals and the university.

Demographics 

The 2021 census reported that immigrants (individuals born outside Canada) comprise 53,210 persons or 20.4% of the total population of Saskatoon. Of the total immigrant population, the top countries of origin were Philippines (11,840 persons or 22.3%), India (5,845 persons or 11.0%), China (4,695 persons or 8.8%), Pakistan (3,975 persons or 7.5%), Nigeria (2,090 persons or 3.9%), United Kingdom (2,045 persons or 3.8%), Bangladesh (1,830 persons or 3.4%), Vietnam (1,510 persons or 2.8%), United States of America (1,470 persons or 2.8%), and Iraq (1,200 persons or 2.3%).

Ethnicity 

The Saskatoon area was inhabited long before any permanent settlement was established, to which the ongoing archaeological work at Wanuskewin Heritage Park and other locations bears witness. Canada's First Nations population has been increasingly urbanized, and nowhere is that more apparent than in Saskatoon, where the First Nations population increased by 382% from 1981 to 2001; however, a portion of this increase, possibly as much as half, is believed to be due to more people identifying themselves as Indigenous in the census rather than migration or birth rate.

Saskatoon has the second highest percentage of Indigenous population among major Canadian cities at approximately 11.5%, behind Winnipeg at 12.4% and Regina close by with 10.4%; in certain neighbourhoods such as Pleasant Hill, this percentage exceeds 40%. Most First Nations residents are of Cree or Dakota cultural background although to a lesser extent Saulteaux, Assiniboine, and Dene communities also exist.

Saskatoon also has a substantial Métis population and is close to the historically significant Southbranch Settlements to the north, as well as the Prairie Ronde settlement near Dundurn, Saskatchewan.

Note: Totals greater than 100% due to multiple origin responses.

Religion 
According to the 2021 census, religious groups in Saskatoon included:
Christianity (134,900 persons or 51.7%)
Irreligion (98,575 persons or 37.8%)
Islam (12,985 persons or 5.0%)
Hinduism (5,125 persons or 2.0%)
Sikhism (3,155 persons or 1.2%)
Buddhism (1,935 persons or 0.7%)
Indigenous Spirituality (1,650 persons or 0.6%)
Judaism (565 persons or 0.2%)
Other (2,065 persons or 0.8%)

According to the 2011 Census, 66% of the population identify as Christian, with Catholics (28.5%) making up the largest denomination, followed by United Church (10.9%), and other denominations. Others identify as Muslim (2.6%), Buddhist (0.8%), Hindu (0.7%), with traditional (indigenous) spirituality (0.5%), and with other religions. 28.5% of the population report no religious affiliation.

Culture

Events and festivals
Saskatoon's major arts venue is TCU Place, which is next to Midtown Plaza downtown. Since opening in 1967, it has hosted scores of concerts, theatrical performances, live events such as the Telemiracle telethon, high school graduation and university convocation ceremonies, and conventions. It is also home to the Saskatoon Symphony Orchestra. It recently underwent a multimillion-dollar renovation to its main theatre (named in honour of former mayor and senator Sidney Buckwold). 

For rock concerts and major shows, SaskTel Centre is the main venue. It is Saskatchewan's
largest arena, with a capacity of 15,195 for sporting events and 14,000 for concerts. Musical acts from Saskatoon include Joni Mitchell, Kyle Riabko, Wide Mouth Mason, The Northern Pikes, The Sheepdogs, One Bad Son and The Deep Dark Woods, as well as countless others popular at both local and regional levels.  The facility was the 2007 host for the Juno Awards, Canada's foremost music industry honours.

Saskatoon hosts many festivals and events in the summer, including the Shakespeare on the Saskatchewan Festival, The Great Plains Comedy Festival, the Jazz Festival, the Saskatchewan Children's Festival, the Saskatoon Fringe Theatre Festival (a showcase of alternative theatre), Saskatoon Folkfest (a cultural festival), Doors Open Saskatoon, Fairy Door Tours Saskatoon and the Canada Remembers Airshow.

For over 25 years, Saskatoon has hosted a gathering of antique automobiles, (mainly from the 1960s) that has grown into an event called "Cruise Weekend". The event is usually held on the last weekend (Friday, Saturday and Sunday) in August. Activities include a poker derby, dances, and a show 'N' shine with over 800 cars from all over western Canada. No admission is charged and everyone is free to walk around and enjoy the atmosphere.

The city's annual exhibition (now called the Saskatoon Exhibition but also known in previous years as Pioneer Days and "The Ex") is held every August at Prairieland Park. In the late 1990s, the Saskatoon Exhibition was rescheduled to August so that it no longer was in direct competition with the Calgary Stampede, which frequently overlapped the event.

Saskatoon's Sikh community celebrates the festival of Vaisakhi with a parade held in May.

The francophone community is represented by the Fédération des francophones de Saskatoon which organizes many cultural events.

Galleries and museums

Art museums in Saskatoon include the Remai Modern, located at River Landing, a development along the shoreline of the South Saskatchewan River, in the Central Business District. The art museum is situated in a  building designed by Bruce Kuwabara, and houses over 8,000 works in its collection. The design for the museum won the Award of Excellence from the Canadian Architect magazine in 2011.  Pablo Picasso, Georges Braque and other 20th-century artists have a home in the Remai Modern museum. Opened on October 21, 2017, the Remai Modern has been listed at no. 18 in the New York Times "52 places to go in 2018: A starter kit for escaping into the world." The Remai Modern inherited the collection of the defunct Mendel Art Gallery, which operated in City Park from 1964 to 2015.

The Saskatchewan Craft Council Gallery is on the main floor of the Saskatchewan Craft Council building in the Broadway Avenue area. It is Saskatchewan's only public exhibition gallery dedicated to fine craft as an art form. Saskatchewan Craft Council Gallery presents seven to eight exhibitions each year. The SCC Fine Craft Boutique, located in the gallery, features the work of over 75 SCC fine craft artists.

The Ukrainian Museum of Canada is on the banks of the South Saskatchewan River. It was founded in 1941 by the Ukrainian Women's Association of Canada.

The Meewasin Valley Centre, in Friendship Park, has information on Saskatoon's history, the South Saskatchewan River, and the future of the Meewasin Valley.

Saskatoon is also home of the Saskatchewan Western Development Museum. This museum, one of four throughout the province, documents early pioneer life in Saskatchewan. It is noted for its interior recreation of a "Boom Town" main street, including one original building relocated from its original site. The Saskatchewan Railway Museum is just outside the city and includes displays of rolling stock and historic railway buildings from various parts of the province.

The Forestry Farm Park and Zoo is a National Historic Site situated in the northeast region of the city. The Forestry Farm was a historic nursery (dating from 1913) responsible for growing many of the trees planted within the prairie provinces. In 1966 the nursery operations were discontinued and part of the region turned into a municipal park. The city zoo is also housed within the park and features over 80 species of animals.
Wanuskewin Heritage Park is a National Historic Site situated five km to the north of Saskatoon. It is an Indigenous archaeological site and features displays, special events, and activities, recent renovations are on hold due to a lack of funds during the renovations.

Theatres

Live theatre is a central, vibrant part of Saskatoon's culture. Saskatoon is host to a number of live theatre venues such as the Persephone Theatre, which is in the Remai Arts Centre at River Landing in downtown Saskatoon, The Refinery and the Saskatchewan Native Theatre Company.

The Broadway Theatre primarily shows arthouse films – while the two-screen Roxy Theatre is an "atmospheric-style" second-run theatre that reopened in 2005 after sitting unused for over a decade. The remainder of the city's theatres are multiplexes. The only movie theatre in the downtown core is the Scotia Bank VIP Theatre; the Capitol 4 shut down on April 3, 2008. The city's other movie theatres are The Landmark Theatre in the new subdivision of Brighton, Rainbow Cinemas (a second-run cinema) and the Cineplex Cinemas at The Centre mall on the city's east side.

Among the many movie theatres of the past that have come and gone was the Capitol Theatre, which opened in 1929 with a showing of the first talkie to be exhibited in Saskatoon. The Capitol closed in the early 1980s to make way for the Scotia Centre office tower; its name was transferred to the aforementioned Capitol 4 a block away. Saskatoon is home to a large blues/jazz community that frequents many bars and clubs known for their blues- and jazz-related acts, including Amigo's, Buds on Broadway, The Black Cat Tavern, Village Guitar & Amp Co., The Bassment, Capitol and formerly Lydia's. The Canadian rock band The Sheepdogs are from Saskatoon.  Joni Mitchell calls Saskatoon her hometown.  The Deep Dark Woods are from Saskatoon.

Other attractions
One of the city's landmarks is the Delta Bessborough Hotel, known to locals as the Bez. Built by the Canadian National Railway, it was among the last railway hotels to be started before the Great Depression of the 1930s brought their era to a close. Although the building was completed in 1932, it did not open its doors until 1935 due to the Depression. The Bessborough and the Mendel Art Gallery are the only major structures on the river side of Spadina Crescent. One of the most frequently circulated photographs of Saskatoon is of the hotel framed in one of the arches of the Broadway Bridge.

The Meewasin Valley Trail follows the South Saskatchewan River through Saskatoon. Summer activities include cycling, jogging and walking through parks and natural areas. Cross-country skiing is popular during the winter months, along with skating in Kiwanis Memorial Park. Access points are found throughout the city with interpretive signage and washrooms along the route. There are parks throughout the Meewasin Valley, with washrooms, picnic facilities, and lookout points along the river bank. In the winter the Meewasin Skating Rink is open free to the public; it is in Kiwanis Memorial Park beside the Delta Bessborough hotel. The outdoor rink has been open since 1980.

For years, a parcel of land west of the Traffic Bridge, south of 19th Street, and east of Avenue C has been the subject of on-again, off-again redevelopment plans. The site formerly held the Saskatoon Arena, a power plant, a branch of the Royal Canadian Legion, and the head offices of the Saskatoon Public School Division; all these structures have been demolished to make way for redevelopment, with plans for same dating back to the 1980s. The most recent version of the plan called River Landing is ongoing. Calgary developer Lake Placid has proposed a 200 million dollar mega hotel/condo project to be built on the site although Lake Placid had difficulty securing financing and missed an October 30, 2009, deadline to submit a 4.5 million dollar payment for the parcel of land which seemingly killed the deal. On November 16, 2009, it was revealed by Lake Placid that the financing should be secure within a week. In April 2010, Saskatoon City Council voted in favour of entering new negotiations with Lake Placid over the site.
November 2010, Victory Majors Investments buys out Lake Placid's interest in the project and in
August 2011 of the next year proposed a major overhaul to original design which would later include building a 20-story residential and 14-story hotel towers, and a 18-story and 13-story office towers as part of River Landing Village completed in 2021.

The Saskatoon Farmers' Market and some commercial sites have also been developed. Future plans separate from Lake Placid include the development of a new art gallery to replace the Mendel Art Gallery by 2014. Other landmarks in the city include the iconic Traffic Bridge (which was demolished in 2016 and is currently being replaced by a new structure evoking the appearance of the original), the University of Saskatchewan campus, and the large Viterra grain terminal which has dominated the western skyline of the city for decades and is large enough to be visible from Pike Lake Provincial Park 32 km away.

Shopping centres

 Blairmore Shopping Centre
 The Centre
 Confederation Mall
 Erindale Centre/University Heights Mall
 The Mall at Lawson Heights
 Market Mall
 Midtown Plaza
 Preston Crossing
 River City Mall
 Stonegate Shopping Centre (in Stonebridge)

Economy

The economy of Saskatoon has been associated with potash, oil and agriculture (specifically wheat), resulting in the moniker "POW City". Various grains, livestock, oil and gas, potash, uranium, gold, diamond, coal and their spin off industries fuel the economy. The world's largest publicly traded uranium company, Cameco, and the world's largest potash producer, Nutrien, have corporate headquarters in Saskatoon. Saskatoon is also the new home of BHP Billiton's Diamonds and Specialty Products business unit.

Nearly two-thirds of the world's recoverable potash reserves are in the Saskatoon region. Innovation Place founded in 1980 brings together almost 150 agriculture, information technology, and environmental, life sciences and agricultural biotechnology industries in a science park or technology park setting. Saskatoon is also home to the Canadian Light Source, Canada's national synchrotron facility.

Saskatoon's digital media scene is growing with start-up tech companies such as Noodlecake, Point2, Vendasta Technologies, and Zu.

One of Saskatoon's nicknames, "Hub City", refers to its ideal central location within Canada for distribution and logistics. Saskatoon John G. Diefenbaker International Airport with 105,620 aircraft movements in 2008 was listed as the 19th busiest airport in Canada, 12th busiest in passenger traffic.

Saskatoon is developing the South Central Business District, or block 146, which is called the River Landing Project. Long range planning is underway for an expected city population of 325,000 by 2028 (2011 MXD report).

Saskatoon was expected to see a 4.2 percent growth in gross domestic product for the year 2012. The city saw a 3.4% growth in 2004, 5.1% increase in 2005 and a 2.8% increase in 2006. Saskatoon held Canada's No. 1 economic growth spot for Canada in 2005 according to the Conference Board of Canada. The Conference Board again predicted the city would rate first for economic increase in 2012, showing a growth rate of 4.2%. The Saskatoon Regional Economic Development Authority (SREDA) has also been ranked amongst Canada's top ten economic development organizations by Site Selection magazine.

From 1988 to 2016 Hitachi Canadian Industries operated a power equipment manufacturing plant. It was closed and assets acquired by Brandt Group in 2017.

Government and Politics

Local
Municipal elections are held in the fall. Until 1954, Saskatoon's mayors served one-year terms while City Councillors (aldermen, until 1991) were elected for two years. After 1954, both served for two-year terms. Beginning with the 1970 election, terms for both were extended to three years, and to four years starting in 2016. Until the 1976 election, terms didn't start until the new year. The years of service given are actual calendar years (give or take a day or two). But beginning in 1976 year, the Mayor and Council were sworn in at the next meeting after the election, so that an alderman whose dates of service are 1976-1979 has served from Nov 1, 1976 to Nov. 5, 1979.

Also see:

Provincial

As of October 26, 2020, Saskatoon is represented in the Legislative Assembly of Saskatchewan by 14 of the province's 61 MLAs, 6 of which are members of the NDP and 8 of which are members of the Saskatchewan Party.

Federal
As of September 20, 2021, Saskatoon is represented by 3 MPs in the Canadian House of Commons, all of which belong to the Conservative Party of Canada.

Infrastructure

Health care
The Saskatchewan Health Authority is responsible for health care delivery in the area. They operate three hospitals within the city boundaries, these include Royal University Hospital, Saskatoon City Hospital, and St. Paul's Hospital (Saskatoon). Royal University Hospital is a teaching and research hospital that operates in partnership with the University of Saskatchewan. The health authority also operates hospitals in smaller neighbouring communities. In addition to hospitals the health authority operates long-term care facilities, clinics and other health care services. Jim Pattison Children's Hospital began construction in 2014 and opened in 2019 under the auspices of what was then the Saskatoon Health Region, since absorbed into the Saskatchewan Health Authority.

Policing

The Saskatoon Police Service is the primary police service for the city of Saskatoon and holds both Municipal and Provincial Jurisdiction. The following services also have jurisdiction in Saskatoon: Corman Park Police Service, Royal Canadian Mounted Police, Canadian National Railway Police Service and the Canadian Pacific Railway Police Service. As of December 31, 2012, the SPS had 442 sworn members, 59 Special Constables, and 136 civilian positions.

Crime
The 2006 census crime data, released July 18, 2007, showed Saskatoon leading Canada in violent crime, with 1,606 violent crimes per 100,000 residents annually. However, crime statistics produced by the Saskatoon Police Service shows that crime is on the decline. In 2010, total crimes against people went up 1.28% but total crimes against property fell by 11.75%. In 2014, Saskatoon dropped to fourth highest in Canada for its CSI after being in second place for several years. Crime in Canada uses Crime Severity Index calculated using the crime rate and the severity of those crimes.

In the early 1990s, the Saskatoon police were found to engage in "starlight tours," where officers would arrest Indigenous men and drive them out of the city in the dead of winter to abandon them.

Transportation

Roads and Bridges 
Saskatoon is on the Yellowhead Highway spur of the Trans-Canada Highway system, also known as Highway 16, which connects Saskatchewan, Manitoba, Alberta, and British Columbia. Highways 5, 7, 11, 12, 14, 41, 219, 684, and 762 all meet at Saskatoon, with Highway 60 terminating just outside the southwestern city limits. The following bridges cross the South Saskatchewan River in Saskatoon (in order from upstream):

 Grand Trunk Bridge (rail)
 Gordie Howe Bridge
 Senator Sid Buckwold Bridge
 Traffic Bridge
 Broadway Bridge
 University Bridge
 CPR Bridge (rail)
 Circle Drive Bridge
 Chief Mistawasis Bridge

Construction of Saskatoon's ring road, Circle Drive, began in the mid-1960s (after first being proposed in 1913), and was completed on July 31, 2013, with the opening of the $300 million South Circle Drive project.

Rail 
The Canadian Pacific Railway and the Canadian National Railway have connections to Saskatoon. Both railways operate intermodal facilities and trans-load centres; while Canadian National Railway also operates an automotive transfer facility. Saskatoon is a stop on The Canadian passenger transcontinental rail route operated by Via Rail. The Saskatoon railway station is in the city's west end; it opened in the late 1960s as a replacement for Saskatoon's original main station which was on 1st Avenue downtown—the relocation of the station sparked a major redevelopment of the downtown that included the construction of the Midtown Plaza, TCU Place (originally named the Centennial Auditorium) and other developments. The many provincial transportation connections and geographic location of Saskatoon give it one of its nicknames The Hub City. The Saskatchewan Railway Museum is just outside the city. Recent debates about moving all the railways out of the city are raising questions about a future LRT system, but the city's Mayor says the population is too small.

Air 
Saskatoon/John G. Diefenbaker International Airport, located in the city's northwest, provides scheduled and charter airline service for the city, and is a significant hub for mining and remote locations in Northern Saskatchewan. Non-stop scheduled destinations include Calgary, Edmonton, Las Vegas, Minneapolis, Ottawa, Prince Albert, Regina, Toronto, Vancouver, and Winnipeg. Seasonal and Charter service is provided to Mexico, Cuba, Dominican Republic, Phoenix and Churchill, MB. Air Canada, Westjet and Purolator Courier all have cargo facilities at the airport. Saskatoon/Corman Air Park is a general aviation airport 15 km southeast of Saskatoon.

Bus 
Transit operations in Saskatoon are provided by Saskatoon Transit. The route system was revamped in 2018, creating high-frequency corridors on 22nd Street, 8th Street, and College Drive. An up-to-date schedule is posted at Saskatoon Transit Route & Schedule Adjustments. Saskatoon was serviced by STC for bus service connecting across the province until May 2017, and Greyhound Canada for inter-provincial bus service between Manitoba and Alberta until Greyhound discontinued service on October 31, 2018.

Education

Saskatoon has a number of higher education institutions:
 University of Saskatchewan
 St. Thomas More College is a Catholic federated college of the University of Saskatchewan. Affiliated with the University of Saskatchewan are the Lutheran Theological Seminary, College of Emmanuel and St. Chad (Anglican Church of Canada), and St. Andrew's College (United Church of Canada). All three are on the university campus.
 The First Nations University of Canada – Saskatoon campus.
 Saskatchewan Polytechnic
 Gabriel Dumont Institute
 Saskatchewan Indian Institute of Technologies

Saskatoon has 78 elementary schools and 14 high schools, serving about 37,000 students. Saskatoon has three main school boards, the Saskatoon Public School Division, the Saskatoon Catholic School Division and the Conseil des Ecoles Fransaskoises.

The western annexation of what is now called the Blairmore SDA also brought the Yarrow Youth Farm within the city limits; operated by the Province of Saskatchewan, this was a correction facility for at-risk youth. The facility was subsequently closed in March 2015 and the land, located within the under-development Kensington community, was out up for sale the following autumn.

Sports and recreation

Ice hockey is one of the most popular sports in Saskatoon and is home to numerous amateur teams such as the Saskatoon Blades of the WHL, who host their games in SaskTel Centre (formerly known as Credit Union Centre and Saskatchewan Place). Saskatoon is also home to amateur teams at the Junior B and Midget AAA levels, as well as several youth teams. Saskatoon was a major league hockey city from 1921 to 1926 when the WCHL/WHL Sheiks/Crescents played. They made it as far as the league semi-finals twice, not far enough to challenge for the Stanley Cup.

The biggest chance for a return of major professional hockey came in 1982. Bill Hunter, a local sports promoter, attempted to purchase the St. Louis Blues of the NHL and move it to Saskatoon, but the move was prevented by the league. This was due to Saskatchewan's and especially Saskatoon's small size in relation to both St. Louis and the other cities in the NHL at the time. However, it did cause the building of the Credit Union Centre, on the city's northern edge. Prior to hosting the 2010 World Junior Hockey tournament, the arena underwent a major expansion which increased seating capacity to approximately 15,200 and also created several new box suites.

Starting in 2016, the Saskatchewan Rush played in the National Lacrosse League after moving from Edmonton. The Saskatchewan Rush won the league Championship against the Buffalo Bandits that same year.

Saskatoon is home to the Saskatchewan Rattlers professional basketball team playing in the CEBL. The Rattlers won the inaugural CEBL championship in 2019.

Canadian football is one of the most successful on field sports in Saskatoon. The University of Saskatchewan Huskies are one of the top University football programs in Canada, with three Vanier Cup national championships and 19 Hardy Trophy Canada West championships. The Huskies have made nine Vanier Cup appearances since 1990, and were the first team from outside of Ontario to host the Vanier Cup, hosting the game in 2006. As well, the Saskatoon Hilltops of the Canadian Junior Football League host their games at Gordie Howe Bowl. The Hilltops have won 19 national junior championships throughout their history.

The University of Saskatchewan Huskies play Canadian Interuniversity Sport league games at the University Campus. Their facilities include 6,171 seat Griffiths Stadium, 700 seat Rutherford Arena, and the state-of-the-art 2,500 seat Physical Activity Complex, opened August 2003 in conjunction with the new College of Kinesiology Building. The Huskies participate in twelve sports at the CIS level and have been most successful in football (Conference champions 18 times/National champions 3 times), men's volleyball (Conference champions 11 times/National champions 4 times) women's basketball National Champions once and men's and women's Track and Field(Conference champions 37 times/ National champions 12 times). Saskatoon is also currently constructing a new arena to be home of the university hockey team. The Merlis Belsher Place complex consists of a 2,700 spectator ice arena, and a second NHL-size ice surface. It also houses the two official NBA-size Gymnasiums. The facility is next door to the Saskatoon Field House which features an indoor track; indoor courts for tennis, badminton, soccer and basketball; a weight room; fitness/dance studios on the U of S Lands South Management Area, Saskatoon on campus.

In 2007, two new sports teams came into being in Saskatoon, the Saskatchewan SWAT of the Rocky Mountain Lacrosse League and the Saskatoon Accelerators in the Canadian Major Indoor Soccer League. The Accelerators play at the Kinsmen/Henk Ruys Soccer Centre, while the SWAT play at the Gordie Howe Kinsmen Arena. There are currently no baseball teams in Saskatoon. In the past there have been various teams including the Saskatoon Yellow Jackets, Saskatoon Riot, Saskatoon Smokin' Guns, Saskatoon Stallions, and the Saskatoon Legends.

Motor racing is a popular sport in Saskatoon. Saskatchewan International Raceway has been in operation for over 40 years; SIR is home to 1/4 mile IHRA drag racing and holds racing events from May to September. As well, just north of the city lies Wyant Group Raceway the paved oval track is home to local stock car racing, as well as races for several different Western Canadian series. In 2009, the NASCAR Canadian Tire Series make its inaugural stop at Wyant Group Raceway, Formerly known as Auto Clearing Motor Speedway, signalling a move to a larger profile track in Saskatoon. Marquis Downs at Prairieland Park offers live horse racing from May to October.

The city also is home to a number of sports and recreation centres, including two full size soccer facilities under the control of the non-profit Saskatoon Soccer Centre organization. The Kinsmen/Henk Ruys Soccer Centre is composed of four sport court indoor fields and the SaskTel Sports Centre hosts two full sized outdoor turf fields, one indoor full sized turf field, one indoor half sized turf field, and one sport court field. Lions Skatepark was built in the Riversdale area in 2003. As well Saskatoon is home to several golf courses and various parks which include tennis courts, ball diamonds and soccer pitches for spring, summer and fall use and outdoor rinks for winter use. Blackstrap Ski Hill is also 30 minutes south of the city, however, has been closed since 2006 due to financial difficulty.

Other major sports events held by Saskatoon:
 1984 World Junior Baseball Championship
 2002 Women's Softball World Championship
 2009 Men's Softball World Championship
 2015 Men's Softball World Championship

The Canadian Crown in Saskatoon

Saskatoon has welcomed members of the Royal Family since 1919. The Queen most recently visited for a gala concert at Credit Union Centre, before a live audience of 12,000 and television viewers nationwide in 2005. The Queen was presented with the key to the city on the same visit, after touring the Canadian Light Source synchrotron and greeting thousands of well-wishers on a walkabout at the University of Saskatchewan (the Queen traditionally stayed at the on-campus residence of the President of the University of Saskatchewan when she visited the city). Sovereigns and consorts who have visited include Edward VIII as Prince of Wales in 1919, King George VI and Queen Elizabeth in 1939, and Elizabeth II and the Duke of Edinburgh, as Princess Elizabeth in 1951 and afterwards as Queen in 1959, 1978, 1987 and 2005.

Other members of the Royal Family who have visited include Princess Margaret, Countess of Snowdon in 1980, the Prince of Wales (Charles) in 2001, the Princess Anne in 1982 and (as Princess Royal) in 2004, the Duke and Duchess of York (Andrew and Sarah) in 1989, and the Prince Edward in 1978. Governors General and Lieutenant Governors also pay regular visits to Saskatoon. Saskatonian Ray Hnatyshyn is credited with popularising his office as Governor General from 1990 to 1995. Saskatchewan Lieutenant Governors Barnhart, Fedoruk, McNab, Monroe, Porteous and Worobetz were all former residents of Saskatoon.

Connections to the crown include the royal namesakes of about one hundred neighbourhoods, parks, streets, schools and other places. These include King George, Queen Elizabeth and Massey Place neighbourhoods, and Victoria, Coronation and Princess Diana parks. It was at one time considered that Saskatoon's Broadway Bridge would be renamed George V Bridge. Landmarks and institutions also have connections and these include the Royal University Hospital, one of four royal designations in Saskatchewan. Grade schools named for royals include Ecole Victoria School, King George School, Queen Elizabeth School, Prince Philip School and Princess Alexandra School.

Existing and historic hotels with royal namesakes include the King George Hotel which has been recently converted to ultra-luxury condominiums, the King Edward Hotel, the Queen's Hotel and the Patricia Hotel. The Hotel Bessborough was named for a Canadian Governor General who visited the landmark under construction in the 1930s. The Queen Elizabeth Power Station is within the city and named after Queen Elizabeth. The Prince of Wales Promenade along the South Saskatchewan River is a focal point on the riverfront trails. In 2002, 378 Saskatoon residents were presented with Canada's Golden Jubilee Medal by vice-regals to commemorate the fiftieth anniversary of the Queen's accession to the throne.

Sister Cities 
Saskatoon has partnered itself with three cities around the world. Notably though, it has not taken on a new partnership since joining with Chernvitsi in 1991, over 30 years ago. The city says it is working on a proper policy and management framework for handling new applications as Madison, Wisconsin applied to be a twin in 2018, but was told Saskatoon had no intention to move forward with the plan "at this time."
Chernivtsi, Ukraine (1991)
Shijiazhuang, China (1985)
Umeå, Sweden (1975)

Media

Notable people

See also
 List of place names in Canada of Indigenous origin

Notes

References

External links

 
1883 establishments in Canada
1883 establishments in the Northwest Territories
Cities in Saskatchewan
Populated places established in 1883
Populated places on the South Saskatchewan River